Yeo Wan Ling (born 1976) is a Singaporean politician. A member of the governing People's Action Party (PAP), she has been the Member of Parliament (MP) representing the Punggol Shore division of Pasir Ris–Punggol GRC since 2020.

Career
Yeo was the founder and chief executive officer of social enterprise Caregiver Asia; which aggregates freelance caregivers and care services for deployment into homes, healthcare institutes and welfare organisations. Before that, Yeo worked at the Economic Development Board as part of the global operations team.

Education
Yeo graduated with a Bachelor of Social Sciences (second upper honours) in sociology and political science from the National University of Singapore.

References

1976 births
Members of the Parliament of Singapore
National University of Singapore alumni
People's Action Party politicians
Singaporean politicians of Chinese descent
Singaporean women in politics
Living people